Populus fremontii, commonly known as Frémont's cottonwood, is a cottonwood (and thus a poplar) native to riparian zones of the Southwestern United States and northern through central Mexico. It is one of three species in Populus sect. Aigeiros. The tree was named after 19th-century American explorer and pathfinder John C. Frémont.

Distribution
The tree is native to the Southwestern United States and Mexico. In the United States, the species can be found in California, Idaho, Nevada, Utah, Arizona, New Mexico, Texas, and Colorado. In Mexico, it can be found in Baja California, Baja California Sur, Sonora, Chihuahua, Coahuila, Nuevo León, México (state), and Puebla.

A riparian tree, it grows near streams, rivers, springs, seeps, wetlands, and well-watered alluvial bottomlands at elevations below  elevation.

Description

The bark is smooth when young, becoming deeply fissured with whitish, cracked bark on old trees.

Autumn colors occur from October–November, mainly a bright yellow, also orange, rarely red.

The inflorescence consists of a long, drooping catkin, which blooms from March to April. The fruit is a wind-dispersed achene, that appears to look like patches of cotton hanging from limbs, thus the name cottonwood.

The largest known P. fremontii tree in the United States grows in Skull Valley, Arizona.

Subspecies or varieties
Two subspecies are currently recognized. Some confusion due to hybridization with a Rio Grande subspecies of Populus deltoides subsp. wislizeni had originally placed this eastern cottonwood subspecies as a P. fremontii subspecies, but it was removed in 1977.
P. f. subsp. fremontii, with synonyms P. f. var. arizonica - Sarg. and P. f. var. macdougalii - (Rose) Jeps. from California and west of the Continental Divide
P. f. subsp. mesetae - Eckenwal., of arid areas of Mexico and west Texas, and widely planted elsewhere, generally east of the Continental Divide

Uses

Cultivation
P. fremontii is cultivated as an ornamental tree and riparian zone restoration tree. It is used in planting for wildlife food and shelter habitats, and ecological restoration, larger native plant and wildlife gardens, and natural landscaping projects, windbreaks, erosion control, and shade for recreation facilities, parks, and livestock.

Frémont's cottonwood was used in the past by settlers and ranchers for fuel and fence posts.

Native Americans
Traditional medicine
Native Americans in the Western United States and Mexico used parts of Frémont's cottonwood variously for a medicine, in basket weaving, for tool making, and for musical instruments. The inner bark of Frémont's cottonwood contains vitamin C and was chewed as an antiscorbutic - treatment for vitamin C deficiency. The bark and leaves could be used to make poultices to reduce inflammation or to treat wounds.

Art
The  Pima people of southern Arizona and northern Mexico lived along Sonoran Desert watercourses and used twigs from the tree in the fine and intricate baskets they wove. The Cahuilla people of southern California used the tree's wood for tool making, the Pueblo peoples for drums, and the Lower Colorado River Quechan people in ritual cremations. The Hopi of Northeastern Arizona carve the root of the cottonwood to create kachina dolls.

See also
California native plants
Riparian buffer
Riparian forest

References

External links

Calflora Database: Populus fremontii (Fremont cottonwood)
Calflora Database: Populus fremontii ssp. fremontii
Populus fremontii — U.C. Photo gallery
 Populus fremontii ssp. fremontii — U.C. Photo gallery

fremontii
Trees of Mexico
Trees of the Southwestern United States
Trees of Northwestern Mexico
Trees of Baja California
Trees of Baja California Sur
Trees of Chihuahua (state)
Trees of Coahuila
Trees of the Northwestern United States
Trees of the South-Central United States
Trees of Nuevo León
Trees of Puebla
Trees of Sonora
Flora of the Sonoran Deserts
Flora of the California desert regions
Flora of the Cascade Range
Flora of California
Flora of the Great Basin
Flora of the Klamath Mountains
Flora of the Sierra Nevada (United States)
Flora of the State of Mexico
Flora of the Rio Grande valleys
Natural history of the California Coast Ranges
Natural history of the Central Valley (California)
Natural history of the Colorado Desert
Natural history of the Lower Colorado River Valley
Natural history of the Mojave Desert
Natural history of the Peninsular Ranges
Natural history of the Santa Monica Mountains
Plants used in traditional Native American medicine
Garden plants of North America
Ornamental trees
Taxa named by Sereno Watson
Flora without expected TNC conservation status